Tay Jun Kiat Kiki (born 14 December 1981) known professionally as Kiki Tay, is a Chinese Singaporean magician, comedian, performing arts director and entrepreneur. Kiki is currently the ambassador of Science Centre Singapore and the Special Effects Designer for the Singapore National Day Parade 2017.

Kiki is the magic and special effects consultant for numerous television and theater productions. He has co-directed mass display segments for the 2009 Asian Youth Games Opening Ceremony, the 2010 Singapore National Day Parade as well as the ASEAN School Games Opening Ceremony. His recent television work, MediaCorp’s "The Illusionist" 魔幻视界 was one of the highest rated drama series on MediaCorp Channel U.

Kiki also regularly stars as "Li", the lead role in the $30 million production Songs of the Sea at Sentosa, Singapore.

In June 2014, Kiki directed a 10 minutes special effects fireworks show for one of Sentosa Singapore's largest launch campaign, The 'State of Fun'

In 2007, Kiki was nominated in the Singapore "Spirit of Enterprise Award" for his entrepreneurial spirit.

Notable achievements

Special Effects Designer for the Singapore National Day Parade 2017
Co-directed the mass display segment "Forging Into the Future" with choreographer Dan Kwoh for the Singapore Youth Festival Opening Ceremony 2012.
Co-directed the mass display segment "Spirit of Evolution" with choreographer Dan Kwoh  for the 2009 Asian Youth Games opening ceremony.
Co-directed the mass display segment for the Singapore Youth Festival opening ceremony.
Co-directed the mass display segment "Sports, Arts & Youth Cultural" with choreographer Dan Kwoh for the 2010 Singapore National Day Parade.
Co-directed the mass display segment "ASEAN ONE" for the 2011 ASEAN School Games Opening Ceremony
Directed Sentosa Development Corporation's 2014 "State of Fun" rebranding campaign Fireworks Show.
Nominated for Singapore's "Spirit of Enterprise Award" for entrepreneurship in 2007.
Awarded "Best Actor" in Singapore Armed Forces (SAF) Music & Drama Company

National and large-scale events

Special Effects Designer for the Singapore National Day Parade 2017
Mass display segment "Spirit of Evolution," Asian Youth Games Opening Ceremony, Singapore 2009 – Co-director.
Mass display segment "Sports, Arts & Youth Cultural’ 2010 Singapore National Day Parade – Co-director.
Finale mass display segment, Singapore Youth Festival Opening Ceremony, indoor stadium, Singapore 2008 – Co-director
Finale mass display segment "ASEAN ONE", ASEAN School Games Opening Ceremony, Max Pavilion, Singapore 2011 - Co-director
Mass display segment "Forging Into the Future" with choreographer Dan Kwoh for the Singapore Youth Festival Opening Ceremony 2012.
Fireworks show for Sentosa Development Corporation's 2014 "State of Fun" rebranding campaign - Director

Television

MediaCorp Channel U ‘The Illusionist’ – Magic Consultant
MediaCorp Festival 2010 – Illusionist
MediaCorp Channel 8 Star Awards 2009 – Magic Consultant
MediaCorp Channel 8 'Ren Ci Charity Show 2007' – Magic Consultant
MediaCorp Channel 5 "2MM" – Magic Consultant, Illusionist
MediaCorp Channel 8 "She's The One!" – Magic Consultant
MediaCorp Channel 8 "A-Star Planners" – Magic Consultant
MediaCorp Channel 8 "IN-Kids" – Magic Consultant, Magician
MediaCorp Channel 8 "Gone in 72 Days" – Magic Consultant, Magician
MediaCorp Channel 8 "Makeover Pte Ltd" – Magic Consultant, Magician
MediaCorp Channel 8 "My Heartland Carnival" - Featured Artist
TVB (Hong Kong) Chinese New Year Countdown Show 2013 - Featured Artist
TVB Chinese New Year Countdown Show 2013  馬國明 & 吳卓羲 combined item - Choreographer

Theatre

Chestnuts 50, Drama Centre Singapore 2015 - Magic Consultant
Kumar Stands up for Singapore, Esplanade Theatre 2015 - Special Effects Consultant
Jack & The Bean-Sprout!, 2013 Drama Centre Singapore - Magic Consultant
Wonderment, Marina Bay Sands, MasterCard Theatres 2013  - Special Effects Consultant
SCAPE Magic Carnival, Singapore 2011 - Producer, Playwright, Director
Cinderel-Lah!, Singapore 2010  – Magic Consultant
Destination Imagination, Singapore 2010 - Producer, Playwright, Director
WAAH! Magic!, Singapore 2009 - Producer, Playwright, Director
Just Kiki Kidding!, Singapore 2008 – Producer, Playwright, Director
Wizard of Oz, Singapore 2008 – Magic Consultant
Snow White and the Seven Dwarfs, Singapore 2008 – Magic Consultant
InDanCity, Singapore 2008  – Magic & Special Effects Consultant
Blithe Spirit, Singapore 2007 – Magic Consultant
"251", Singapore 2007 – Special Effects Consultant
Asian Boys Vol.3, Singapore 2007 – Magic Consultant
The Next Wave, Singapore 2007 - Magic & Special Effects Consultant
Let Me Entertain You!, Singapore2006 – Magic & Special Effects Consultant
Little Shop of Horrors, Singapore 2006 – Magic Consultant
'Oi! Sleeping Beauty, Singapore 2005 – Magic Consultant
Aladdin, Singapore 2005 – Magic Consultant
Ten Brothers, Singapore 2005 – Magic Consultant

Early career

Kiki's passion for magic began while in school. While working as a part-time supervisor in a fast food restaurant, Kiki would spend most of his income on magic props and books, building his stage repertoires and working on his career at a very young age. In his early years, Kiki performed for his school functions and charity shows.

Kiki began his career as a professional magician in 1995 after he was discovered by Vivien Goh, owner of the Zephyhdom talent management company. Kiki worked in the company for five years as a magician, clown, balloon artist and juggler entertaining audiences at birthday parties and corporate events before he moved his focus on directing and consultation work. Kiki still performs professionally for corporate events. Kiki served in the Singapore Armed Forces (SAF) Music & Drama Company where he received training in music, speech, drama, dance and acting. In his two years service in the company, Kiki received the title “Best Actor” in the outstanding artist award.

References

External links
Kiki Tay's official website

1981 births
Living people
Singaporean people of Chinese descent
Singaporean magicians